The 2004 Michigan State Spartans football team represented Michigan State University in the 2004 NCAA Division I-A football season. Michigan State competed as a member of the Big Ten Conference, and played their home games at Spartan Stadium in East Lansing, Michigan. The Spartans were led by second-year head coach John L. Smith.

Schedule

Roster

Game summaries

Indiana

Coaching staff
John L. Smith – Head Coach
Jim McElwain – Assistant Head Coach/Wide receivers coach/Special Teams coordinator
Dave Baldwin – Offensive Coordinator/Tight end coach
Doug Nussmeier – Quarterbacks coach
Reggie Mitchell – Running backs coach/Recruiting coordinator
Jeff Stoutland – Offensive line coach
Chris Smeland – Defensive Coordinator
Steve Stripling – Defensive line coach
Mike Cox – Linebackers coach
Paul Haynes – Defensive backs coach

2005 NFL Draft
The following players were selected in the 2005 NFL Draft.

References

Michigan State
Michigan State Spartans football seasons
Michigan State Spartans football